Eupithecia rhoisata is a moth in the family Geometridae. It is found in Libya.

References

Moths described in 1917
rhoisata
Moths of Africa